Veronika Andrukhiv (born 5 May 1996) is a Ukrainian footballer who plays as a forward and has appeared for the Ukraine women's national team.

Career
Andrukhiv has been capped for the Ukraine national team, appearing for the team during the 2019 FIFA Women's World Cup qualifying cycle.

References

External links
 
 
 

1996 births
Living people
People from Burshtyn
Ukrainian women's footballers
Women's association football forwards
WFC Zhytlobud-2 Kharkiv players
Ukraine women's international footballers
Ukrainian expatriate women's footballers
Ukrainian expatriate sportspeople in Romania
Expatriate women's footballers in Romania
Sportspeople from Ivano-Frankivsk Oblast